Bridgeport Township may refer to:
 Bridgeport Township, Lawrence County, Illinois
 Bridgeport Charter Township, Michigan

Township name disambiguation pages